Rajunaidu Gnanagurusamy is an Indian politician belonging to the Dravida Munnetra Kazhagam.He was elected to the Lok Sabha the lower house of Indian Parliament from Periyakulam.He did his graduation in  Thiagaraja College in Madurai and later did Bachelor of Law in Madras Law College.

References 

1947 births
Living people
Dravida Munnetra Kazhagam politicians
DHINAKARAN
Lok Sabha members from Tamil Nadu
People from Theni district